Acleris uniformis is a species of moth of the family Tortricidae. It is found in Russian Far East (Ussuri), South Korea and Japan (Hokkaido, Honshu).

The wingspan is about 16 mm.

References

Moths described in 1931
uniformis
Moths of Asia